The Abingdon by-election was held on 30 June 1953 after the previous MP, Ralph Glyn was elevated to the peerage.

References

Abingdon 1953
Abingdon by-election
By-election 1953
Abingdon by-election
Abingdon 1953
1953 Abingdon by-election
Abingdon by-election